In mathematics, biangular coordinates are a coordinate system for the plane where  and  are two fixed points, and the position of a point P not on the line  is determined by the angles  and

See also
Two-center bipolar coordinates
Bipolar coordinates
Sectrix of Maclaurin

References

External links
G. B. M. Zerr Biangular Coordinates, American Mathematical Monthly 17 (2), February 1910
 J. C. L. Fish, Coordinates Of Elementary Surveying
 George Shoobridge Carr, A synopsis of elementary results in pure mathematics (see page 742)

Coordinate systems